The 2018 Voyager Media Awards (previously the Canon Media Awards) were presented on 11 May 2018 at Cordis, Auckland, New Zealand. Awards were made in the categories of digital, feature writing, general, magazines, newspapers, opinion writing, photography, reporting and videography.

Judges 
The judges for the 2018 awards were: 
 
 Allan Baddock
 Andrew Holden
 Ant Phillips
 Bernard Lagan
 Bill Ralston
 Bruce Davidson
 Bill Moore
 Cate Brett
 Catherine Smith
 Cathy Strong
 Cheryl Norrie
 Clive Lind
 Daron Parton
 David King
 Deborah Coddington
 Deborah Hill Cone
 Debra Miller
 Donna Chisholm
 Fay McAlpine
 Felicity Anderson
 Foster Niumata
 Fran Tyler
 Gilbert Wong
 Grant Dyson
 Greg Dixon
 Irene Chapple
 James Hollings
 Jane Ussher
 Jenny Nicholls
 Jim Tully
 Jim Eagles
 John Hudson
 Joseph Barratt
 Kate Coughlan
 Kerryanne Evans
 Lauren Quaintance
 Lorelei Mason
 Louise Matthews
 Lynda van Kempen
 Matthew Straker
 Michael Field
 Michael Donaldson
 Michele Hewitson
 Miguel D'Souza
 Mike Fletcher
 Mike Valentine
 Mike Bowers
 Nathan Burdon
 Ngahuia Wade
 Nick Brown
 Nick Venter
 Nikki Mandow
 Noelle McCarthy
 Owen Poland
 Paul Cutler
 Paul Mansfield
 Paul Thompson
 Peter Fray
 Richard Harman
 Rick Neville
 Rob Taggart
 Ross Land
 Shane Taurima
 Susan Wood
 Te Anga Nathan
 Wayne Thompson

Winners

Digital 

 Best Innovation in Digital Storytelling: rnz.co.nz/Great Southern TV and Animation Research, NZ Wars: The Stories of Ruapekapeka
 Best News Website or App: nzherald.co.nz
 Website of the Year (joint): Newsroom.co.nz and Stuff

Feature writing 

 Best first-person essay or feature: Peter Wells, The Spinoff
 Sport: Dana Johannsen NZ Herald
 Business and/or personal finance: Rebecca Macfie, New Zealand Listener
 Best feature writer – junior: Mirjam Guesgen, VetScript Magazine

Feature writing (long-form) 

 Arts, entertainment and lifestyle: Simon Wilson, The Spinoff
 Health, education and/or general: Kirsty Johnston, NZ Herald
 Crime, justice and / or social issues: Mike White, North & South
 Feature Writer of the Year: Kate Evans, New Zealand Geographic and North & South

Feature writing (short-form) 

 Arts, entertainment and lifestyle: Greg Bruce, NZ Herald
 Health, education and/or general: Greg Bruce, NZ Herald
 Crime, justice and / or social issues: Donna-Lee Biddle, Waikato Times
 Feature Writer of the Year: Tess McClure, VICE

General 

 Best Headline or hook: Taylor Sincock, Newshub
 Best artwork/graphics (including interactive/motion graphics): Toby Morris, The Spinoff and The Wireless
 Cartoonist of the Year: Sharon Murdoch, The Press, Sunday Star-Times and The Dominion Post
 Reviewer of the Year: Charlotte Grimshaw New Zealand Listener and The Spinoff
 Best trade/specialist publication and/or website: NZ Retail and theRegister.co.nz
 nib Health Journalism Scholarship – junior: Sasha Borissenko, Newsroom.co.nz
 General nib Health Journalism Scholarship – senior: Barbara Fountain, New Zealand Doctor
 Science and Technology Award (joint): Donna Chisholm North & South, NZ Listener and Kate Evans, New Zealand Geographic and North & South
 Environmental / Sustainability Award: Isobel Ewing, Newshub
 Best editorial campaign or project: nzherald.co.nz - Break The Silence
 Editorial Executive of the Year: Murray Kirkness, Editor, NZ Herald
 Wolfson Fellowship: Matt Nippert, NZ Herald

Magazines 

 Best magazine design: Metro magazine
 Magazine of the Year: New Zealand Geographic

Newspapers 

 Best newspaper-inserted magazine: The Weekend Mix (Otago Daily Times)
 Best newspaper front page: Hawke's Bay Today
 Community Newspaper of the Year: Mountain Scene
 Newspaper of the Year (up to 30,000 circulation): Waikato Times
 Newspaper of the Year (more than 30,000 circulation): The Press
 Weekly Newspaper of the Year: Weekend Herald 
 Voyager Newspaper of the Year: Weekend Herald

Opinion writing 

 Opinion writing - general and/or sport: Leah McFall Sunday magazine, Sunday Star-Times
 Opinion writing - humour/satire: Dave Armstrong, The Dominion Post
 Opinion writing - business and/or personal finance: Duncan Greive, The Spinoff
 Opinion Writer of the Year: Steve Braunias, NZ Herald

Photography 

 Best feature/photographic essay: Kent Blechynden, scoop.co.nz
 Best photography – general: John Borren, Bay of Plenty Times
 Best photography – portrait: Chris Skelton, The Press
 Best photography – sport: Andrew Cornaga, www.photosport.nz
 Best photography – news: Joseph Johnson, The Press
 Best photo – junior: Kavinda Herath, The Southland Times
 Photographer of the Year: Iain McGregor, Stuff

Reporting 

 Reporter - arts, entertainment and lifestyle: Hikurangi Jackson, Marae
 Reporter - Health, education and/or general: Tony Wall, Stuff
 Reporter - crime, justice and/or social issues: Jared Savage, NZ Herald
 Reporter - Maori affairs: Oriini Kaipara, Maori Television
 Best (single) news story: Melanie Reid, Newsroom.co.nz - Politicians, police, and the payout
 Best investigation: Olivia Carville, NZ Herald - What becomes of the Broken Hearted
 Best team investigation: Stuff Circuit - The Valley, New Zealand's war in Afghanistan
 Best coverage of a major news event: rnz.co.nz - Election 2017
 Best reporter – junior: Nina Hindmarsh, Nelson Mail
 Student Journalist of the Year: Ruby Nyika, Waikato Times
 Community Journalist of the Year: Rob Drent, The Devonport Flagstaff
 Regional Journalist of the Year: Carmen Hall, Bay of Plenty Times
 Sports Journalist of the Year: Dana Johannsen, NZ Herald
 Business Journalist of the Year: Matt Nippert, NZ Herald
 Political Journalist of the Year: Audrey Young, NZ Herald
 Reporter of the Year: Melanie Reid, Newsroom.co.nz

Videography 

 Best news video: George Heard, The Press
 Best feature video: Tasha Impey, Re:, TVNZ
 Best team video – news: 1 NEWS NOW - Edgecumbe's poor flood defenses
 Best team video – feature: NZ Herald - Under The Bridge
 Best videographer – junior: Jaden McLeod, NZ Herald Local Focus
 Videographer of the Year (joint): Alexander Robertson, NZME/Very Nice Productions and Mike Scott, NZ Herald

References 

New Zealand awards
Journalism awards
2018 in New Zealand
Mass media in New Zealand
2018 in New Zealand television